The 2019 Alpine Elf Europa Cup was the second season of the Alpine Elf Europa Cup, the one-make sports car racing series organized by Alpine for Alpine A110 Cup cars. It began on 20 April at Nogaro and finished on 13 October, at Le Castellet after six double-header meetings.

Entry List

Race calendar and results 

 The 2019 calendar was released at the end of season awards ceremony for the 2018 season. A new round at Nogaro was announced to kick off the season with the previous opening round at Le Castellet moved to being the season finale. The Nürburgring round was also dropped in favor of racing at the Hockenheimring and the round at Dijon-Prenois has been left off the calendar. All weekends still support either the International GT Open or the FFSA GT Championship.

Championship Standings

Drivers' Championship 

 Scoring system

Points are awarded to the top 20 drivers. If less than 75% of the race distance is completed then half points are awarded. If less than two laps are completed then no points are given.

Notes

External links 

 Official website

References 

Alpine Elf Europa Cup seasons
Alpine